Alessio Ciulli  (born in Firenze, 22 July 1977) is an Italian British biochemist. Currently, he is the Professor of Chemical & Structural Biology at the School of Life Sciences, University of Dundee, when he founded and directs Dundee' new Centre for Targeted Protein Degradation (CeTPD).  He is also the scientific co-founder and advisor of Amphista Therapeutics.

Educational background
Alessi Ciulli attended University of Florence  in his hometown with an undergraduate laurea in chemistry and graduated magna cum laude. Under the late Prof Ivano Bertini, his final year laurea project was in computational drug design and NMR spectroscopy of matrix metalloproteases. Awarded with a Gates Cambridge Scholarship, he did his PhD under the supervision of the late Professor Chris Abell at the University of Cambridge and in collaboration with Astex Technology ( now Astex Pharmaceuticals ) produced a thesis concerned with studying weak protein-ligand interactions using biophysical and structural methods.

Career
Ciulli remained in Cambridge University to conduct post-doctoral research on fragment-based drug discovery with Professor Abell and Professor Tom L. Blundell, under a College Junior Research Fellowship. Between February and June 2009, Ciulli went to Yale University as Human Frontier Science Programme visiting fellow to visit the laboratory of Professor Craig Crews before returning to Cambridge University to start his independent research career. While at Cambridge, Ciulli was the group leader in the Department of Chemistry, Director of Studies in Chemistry and BBSRC David Phillis Fellow at Christ's College. In April 2013,  he took up a Readership in Chemical & Structural Biology as a principal investigator within the Division of Biological Chemistry and Drug Discovery in the University of Dundee. Ciulli was promoted as the Professor of Chemical & Structural Biology in the same division in October 2016.   In 2017, he co-founded Amphista Therapeutics, a company that focuses on developing drugs based on targeted protein degradation.

Research
With his team in the Ciulli laboratory, Ciulli's works aim to develop small molecules inducing targeted protein degradation and modulating protein-protein interactions. One example of this type of work is the discovery of proteolysis-targeting chimera or PROTAC and its therapeutic potential. Recruitment of an E3 ligase to the target protein by the PROTAC is a critical step in the mechanism of action, because it triggers the target protein to be ubiquitinated and then degraded by the proteasome. Ciulli and his colleagues were the first to produce an X-ray crystal structure of a class of PROTAC simultaneously bound to the target protein and the E3 ubiquitin ligase. Much of Ciulli's research also contributed to studies on the Von Hippel-Lindau protein E3 ligase, especially in targeting the E3 ligase with small molecules. In general, Ciulli's scientific contributions focus on targeted protein degradation (TPD) as a therapeutic modality in cancer and other diseases. His works on TPD led to the founding of Amphista Therapeutics. Amongst the other scientific accomplishments and discoveries of his laboratory, is the development of a chemical-genetic “bump and hole” approach in which Ciulli and colleagues designed an engineered mutant variant of BET bromodomains able to accommodate selectively its binding ligand, enabling the individual roles of BET proteins to be elucidated.

Awards
2009: BBSRC David Phillips Fellowship 
2012: ERC Starting Grant 
2014: Talented Young Italians Award (Research and Innovation) 
2015: EFMC Prize for Young Medicinal Chemist in Academia 
2015: ICBS Young Chemical Biologist Award 
2016: RSC Capps Green Zomaya Award 
2016: MedChemComm Emerging Investigator Lectureship 
2016: Fellow of the Royal Society of Chemistry (FRSC)
2022: Prous Institute-Overton and Meyer Award for New Technologies in Drug Discovery

References

External links
 Lab website
 CeTPD website
 

University of Florence alumni
Academics of the University of Dundee
Living people
1977 births